The Serasa Ferry Terminal, also known as Serasa Muara Terminal and Serasa Terminal, is a passenger terminal operated by the Department of Immigration and National Registration in Mukim Serasa, Brunei-Muara District, Brunei. It is one of the two ferry terminals in Brunei, which is located in Kuala Belait Port and Serasa.

Geography 
The terminal sits at an estimated distance of 20-25 km from Bandar Seri Begawan. Moreover, the passenger terminal took passengers from Brunei to Labuan, Lawas and Sundar, while the car ferry terminal is connected to Menumbok.

History 
In March 2005, the Serasa Vehicle Ferry Terminal was planned to be completed. In 2007, the terminal was renovated to accommodate up to 500 passengers per hour and with several new facilities.

References

External links

Marinetraffic

Establishments in Brunei
Belait District
Ports and harbours in Southeast Asia